Two ships of the Indian Navy have been named INS Vela:

  was a  launched in 1972 and decommissioned in 2010
  is a  launched in 2019

Indian Navy ship names